Georges Béaruné (born 27 July 1989) is a New Caledonian footballer who plays as a defender for AS Magenta in the New Caledonia Super Ligue.

References

1989 births
Living people
New Caledonian footballers
Association football defenders
New Caledonia international footballers
AS Magenta players
Gaïtcha FCN players
2012 OFC Nations Cup players
2016 OFC Nations Cup players